Michał Trzeciakiewicz (born February 19, 1984 in Olsztyn) is a retired Polish footballer (midfielder) who most recently played for Stomil Olsztyn.

Career

Club
He joined Korona during the 2006/07 winter break. Previously he played for Jagiellonia Białystok.

In February 2011, he joined KSZO Ostrowiec on a half year contract.

In July 2011, he moved to Sandecja Nowy Sącz on a one-year contract.

References

External links
 

1984 births
Living people
Polish footballers
OKS Stomil Olsztyn players
Jagiellonia Białystok players
Korona Kielce players
KSZO Ostrowiec Świętokrzyski players
Sandecja Nowy Sącz players
Sportspeople from Olsztyn
Association football midfielders
21st-century Polish people